Tryella is a genus of 14 species of cicada found in Australia and New Guinea. For many years, the members were classified in the genus Abricta. However, recent review of the genus has shown it to be a disparate group of species, and the Australian members moved to other genera. S.M. Moulds conducted a morphological analysis of the genus and found the cicadas split naturally into clades according to biogeographical region. Of the 15 Australian species, the floury baker was the earliest offshoot. Unpublished data confirmed it was quite genetically distant from the other 14 species and so it was classified in a new monotypic genus Aleeta, while the others were placed in the genus Tryella. The genus name is derived from the Ancient Greek tryelis "ladle" and relates to the ladle-shaped uncal lobes of the species in the genus.

The group are commonly called bullets, the name derived from markings behind their heads, which together with their compact bodies make them resemble bullets while in flight.

Phylogenetic evidence supports Tryella and Aleeta as being the closest relatives to the famous periodical cicadas (genus Magicicada) of North America despite being widely geographically separated from them.

Species
The type species is Tryella ochra. Within the group, cladistic morphological analysis showed T. rubra to be the earliest offshoot within the genus. The relationships between other species was not able to be clarified.

Tryella rubra - Large Rusty Bullet
Tryella adela
Tryella ochra
Tryella burnsi - Brown Buzzing Bullet
Tryella castanea
Tryella crassa - Dusky Bullet
Tryella graminea - Grass Buzzing Bullet
Tryella infuscata
Tryella kauma
Tryella lachlani
Tryella noctua
Tryella occidens
Tryella stalkeri
Tryella willsi - Black Buzzing Bullet

Distribution and habitat
The species are found across eastern, central and northern Australia, and southwestern New Guinea, predominantly on trees, especially eucalypti.

Behaviour
Male Tryella cicadas call during the day and dusk. Adults emerge from pupation after monsoonal rain. One species, T. graminea, is found on grass.

References

Hemiptera of Australia
Lamotialnini
Cicadidae genera